Senator Ammons may refer to:

Elias M. Ammons (1860–1925), Colorado State Senate
Teller Ammons (1895–1972), Colorado State Senate